|}

The Warfield Mares' Hurdle is a Grade 2 National Hunt hurdle race in Great Britain which is open to fillies and mares aged four years or older. It is run at Ascot over a distance of about 2 miles 7½ furlongs (2 miles 7 furlongs and 118 yards, or 4,735 metres), and during its running there are eleven hurdles to be jumped. The race is scheduled to take place each year in January. It was first run in 2008.

The race was run as the Oilexco Mares' Only Hurdle, the Warfield Mares' Hurdle in 2009 and the 1942 Was A Vintage Year Mares' Hurdle from 2010 to 2012. Since 2013 it has been run under various sponsored titles. Its current title since 2021 is the Matchbook Betting Podcast Mares' Hurdle.

Winners

See also
 Horse racing in Great Britain
 List of British National Hunt races

References
 Racing Post:
 , 

 pedigreequery.com – Warfield Mares Only Hurdle – Ascot.

National Hunt races in Great Britain
Ascot Racecourse
National Hunt hurdle races
2008 establishments in England
Recurring sporting events established in 2008